The Baptist Union of Zambia is a Baptist Christian denomination in Zambia. It is affiliated with the Baptist World Alliance. The headquarters is in Ndola.

History
The Baptist Union of Zambia has its origins in a South African mission of the Baptist Union of Southern Africa in 1924 It is officially founded in 1975. According to a denomination census released in 2020, it claimed 1,000 churches and 220,000 members.

See also 
 Bible
 Born again
 Worship service (evangelicalism)
 Jesus Christ
 Believers' Church

References

Baptist denominations in Africa
Evangelicalism in Zambia